The Ivankovo massacre, was a spree killing occurred on July 26, 1925 in Ivankovo, Kostromskoy Uyezd, Kostroma Governorate, RSFSR, Soviet Union. Peter Grachev, a peasant, aggrieved at the results of a land redistribution scheme, killed and injured other villagers through the use of rifles and shotguns, after setting a fire to herd the people into an ambush.

Background 

Due to the success of the 1917 October Revolution, Vladimir Lenin issued the Decree on Land, which abolished private property and redistributed land among peasants. As the various lots of land were shuffled, Peter Grachev, a farmer in the small village of Ivankovo, lost out on a lot that he was planning to obtain over his neighboring farmer. Allegedly he became despondent, making repetitive comments: "Just wait and see; I'll get even with everybody."

Event

Grachev sold all his property and possessions and sent his wife to her relatives. On July 26, he set ablaze his neighbors' homes as they were in the field harvesting and positioned himself in order ambush them along the road leading back to the homes. From there, he killed 17 fellow Obshchina residents, fired at firefighters from the adjacent town, and killed 12 horses.

Aftermath 

Grachev fled after the attack and was eventually captured by the local state militia. At trial, he was found to be of sound mind and was sentenced to ten years' solitary confinement. It emerged during these proceedings that prior to the ambush, Grachev killed his entire family and household staff before setting the fires.

References

Mass murder in 1925
Mass shootings in the Soviet Union
1920s mass shootings in Europe
1925 in the Soviet Union
1925 murders in the Soviet Union